Thomas de la More (or Delamore; 1395–1460/1461) was a fifteenth-century Sheriff of Cumberland. Little is known of his early life, but he was a loyal royal official in Cumberland and Westmorland for all his adult life, serving as Member of Parliament, Escheator and Justice of the Peace on multiple occasions. A man of social and political significance in the area, he eventually became involved in the struggle for local supremacy in the 1450s between the Neville and Percy families. This led to him and his men being beaten and threatened by Thomas Percy, Lord Egremont, over which he petitioned the royal council in 1455. De la More played no active part in the Wars of the Roses which broke out the same year. He is known to have married twice. His first wife, called either Idione or Maud, died first, but his second, Margaret, survived him.

Early life and marriage
Little is known of de la More's early life; according to his own testimony, he was born in 1395. The Parliamentary historian J. C. Wedgwood suggests that he may have been the son of a namesake who attended the 1420 parliament. According to the medievalist Carole Rawcliffe, however, Wedgwood is in error, "mistakenly assum[ing] that two different men, father and son, must have sat for Cumberland in 1420 and 1450, whereas they were one and the same". In 1415, de la More was arrested by officers of the Warden of the East March for breaking the truce with Scotland after he was discovered leading raiding parties across the border. At some point, de la More inherited a patrimony, based around Cumcatch, from his parents. He later augmented his estates by purchasing other properties in Branthwaite and took out a 20-year lease on the manors of West Farlam and Sebergham, then owned by the Crown.

By July 1419 de la More had married a woman named either Idione or Maud, who was the widow of William Sandford. She brought de la More the manor of Little Asby by jointure. Rawcliffe suggests that the marriage brought de la More "powerful connections", as her feoffees included Henry Percy, 1st Earl of Northumberland and Ralph Neville, 1st Earl of Westmorland.

De la More's armorial was A cross flory, with a scallop in dexter chief.

Offices and royal service in Cumberland

King Henry VI was six-months old when his father, Henry V, died in 1422. Henry VI began his personal rule in 1437 aged 16. To celebrate the occasion, which the medievalist John Watts called "a sign to political society that the King had come of age", Henry issued a royal pardon to whoever sued for one. Of this, de la More availed himself.

De la More's career was to be a full one. He held royal offices in both Cumberland and Westmorland almost from the point he had entered his majority. He was the King's Escheator from 1431 to 1432 for both counties and was appointed Sheriff of Cumberland in 1443–1444, 1447–1448 and 1452–1453. He was also appointed elector of the county—one who stewarded shire elections to parliament, often in the face of pressure from either the crown or local nobility—in 1437, 1442, 1447 and 1449. He was elected to parliament as the county candidate four times, in 1420, 1429, 1450 and 1455. His second election involved de la More in some political skullduggery. His co-candidate, Sir William Leigh, was not favoured by the then-sheriff Christopher Moresby, who replaced Leigh with his own choice of candidate, Sir Thomas Parr, and without consulting the county court as was required. Moresby found himself able to appoint a new candidate after the original writs of summons were superseded by another that arrived after the election had taken place. He had only to write Parr's and de la More's names on the new writ prior to returning it. The subsequent investigation into Moresby extended into de la More's own first term as Sheriff.

De la More took the 1434 oath not to harbour criminals and disturbers of the King's Peace. This indicates, argues the prosopographer Gilbert Bogner, that de la More was a man whom the crown considered capable of summoning men on its behalf. The historian R. A. Griffiths suggests that men such as de la More were "socially prominent or politically powerful" in their regions. De la More performed a number of legal services for his neighbours also. For example, he was executor of his friend, Sir Robert Lowther's will, and sat on an assize assessing William Stapleton's claim to an estate in Black Hall. He also presented oral evidence to his cousin William de la More's Inquisition post mortem or and acted as a mainpernor to colleagues.

De la More gravitated into the service of Richard Neville, Earl of Salisbury by 1452, and perhaps as early as the previous decade. Within a few years, Salisbury's sons became engaged in a bitter feud with those of the Earl of Northumberland, led by Thomas Percy, Lord Egremont. At the same time, the King was mentally incapacitated and unable to govern. The House of Lords had appointed the Duke of York protector during the King's illness, and York, in turn, made Salisbury his Lord Chancellor. Following the Yorkist victory at the First Battle of St Albans, York held another parliament towards the end of the year, and another general pardon was issued which de la More again took advantage of on 10 October 1455. Both of de la More's pardons, suggests Rawcliffe, were "no doubt to cover himself from charges of malpractice in office". In the latter document, he is listed as "of Comberkath, Cumberland, esq., alias gent., alias late of London". Wedgwood speculates that the latter designation may have been the result of de la More's attendance at the York's parliament between 1455 and 1456.

Relations with Lord Egremont

In July 1454 de la More petitioned the royal council that during his last period as sheriff, Lord Egremont had prevented him from carrying out his official duties. Egremont, complained de la More, had assaulted his deputy sheriffs and servants and had threatened to behead de la More. As a result of Egremont's violence, argues the medievalist R. L. Storey, "the one half of the shire was divided from the other" and de la More's tenure as sheriff was punctuated with "great dissensions, riots and debates". De la More, a protégé of Salisbury's, petitioned the council while his lord was Chancellor, probably in the knowledge that Salisbury would take the opportunity to demonstrate his good lordship to de la More. Although de la More blamed Egremont for his inability to collect £94 of shrieval dues, it seems as likely that it was the result of Scottish border raids having "lyth wast and destroyed" the Cumberland countryside. In any case, de la More was keen that he be respited the amount he had been unable to raise; this was granted on condition that de la More realise it would not set a precedent and that he swear to his losses under oath. The medievalist Peter Booth argues that de la More's preferential treatment at the Exchequer was the direct consequence of his feudal relationship with Salisbury.

Later career and death
De la More continued in royal service almost up to his death. The 1450s, says Rawcliffe, was a "were a particularly strenuous time" for him, as he went on multiple embassies to Scotland, sat on the local Bench as a Justice and attended parliament twice. Wedgwood suggests that his appointment as a keeper of the truce with Scotland in 1457 was one of his last appearances in public office; "he probably died soon after, as he is not on the 1458 or 1462 Pardon Rolls". Rawcliffe does not date de la More's death, merely noting that it must have been "well before" April 1463 due to references in subsequent shrieval writs. He outlived his wife Maud (or Idione), and had remarried a woman known only as Margaret; it was she who acted as executrix for de la More's will. He left no children. De la More's enemy in Cumberland, Lord Egremont, died around the same time. During the civil wars of the late 1450s, he remained loyal to Henry VI, and, acting as the King's personal bodyguard, was slain at the Battle of Northampton in June 1460.

Notes

References

Bibliography 

 
 
 
 
 
 
  
 
 
 
 
 
 
 
 
 
 
 
 
 
 
 
 
 
 
 
 
 
 
 

1395 births
1460s deaths
English MPs 1420
English MPs 1429
Place of birth missing
Year of death uncertain
Place of death missing
English MPs 1450
English MPs 1455